In the mathematical field of representation theory, a highest-weight category is a k-linear category C (here k is a field) that
is locally artinian
has enough injectives
satisfies

for all subobjects B and each family of subobjects {Aα} of each object X
and such that there is a locally finite poset Λ (whose elements are called the weights of C) that satisfies the following conditions:

 The poset Λ indexes an exhaustive set of non-isomorphic simple objects {S(λ)} in C.
 Λ also indexes a collection of objects {A(λ)} of objects of C such that there exist embeddings S(λ) → A(λ) such that all composition factors S(μ) of A(λ)/S(λ) satisfy μ < λ.
 For all μ, λ in Λ,

is finite, and the multiplicity

is also finite.
Each S(λ) has an injective envelope I(λ) in C equipped with an increasing filtration

such that
 
 for n > 1,  for some μ = λ(n) > λ
 for each μ in Λ, λ(n) = μ for only finitely many n

Examples 

 This concept is named after the category of highest-weight modules of Lie-algebras.
 A finite-dimensional -algebra  is quasi-hereditary iff its module category is a highest-weight category. In particular all module-categories over semisimple and hereditary algebras are highest-weight categories.
 A cellular algebra over a field is quasi-hereditary (and hence its module category a highest-weight category) iff its Cartan-determinant is 1.

Notes

References

See also 
Category O

Representation theory